Taygete lasciva is a moth in the family Autostichidae. It was described by Walsingham in 1910. It is found in Panama.

The wingspan is about 8.5 mm. The forewings are pale ochreous, with some streaky shades of darker brownish ochreous above and below the fold, along the cell, and beyond it. A short black streak, at the base, reaches nearly to the nexus, but does not actually touch the margin, and is followed by three, elongate, black costal spots, gradually increasing in size. The first near the base, the second before the middle, the third, and most conspicuous, beyond the middle. Below each of the two latter are a few black dots, and beyond the last is a series of small marginal black spots running around the apex and termen. The hindwings are pale grey.

References

Moths described in 1910
Taygete (moth)